A legislator (also known as a deputy or lawmaker) is a person who writes and passes laws, especially someone who is a member of a legislature. Legislators are often elected by the people of the state. Legislatures may be supra-national (for example, the European Parliament), national (for example, the United States Congress), or local (for example, local authorities).

Overview 
The political theory of the separation of powers requires legislators to be independent individuals from the members of the executive and the judiciary. Certain political systems adhere to this principle, others do not. In the United Kingdom, for example, the executive is formed almost exclusively from legislators (members of Parliament) although the judiciary is mostly independent (until reforms in 2005, the lord chancellor uniquely was a legislator, a member of the executive - indeed, the Cabinet - and a judge, while until 2009 the Lords of Appeal in Ordinary were both judges and legislators as members of the House of Lords, though by convention they did not vote in the House until retirement).

In continental European jurisprudence and legal discussion, "the legislator" is the abstract entity that has produced the laws. When there is room for interpretation, the intent of the legislator will be questioned, and the court is directed to rule in the direction it judges to best fit the legislative intent, which can be difficult in the case of conflicting laws or constitutional provisions.

Terminology 
The local term for a legislator is usually a derivation of the local term for the relevant legislature. Typical examples include
 Parliament: member of parliament
 Assembly: member of the assembly
 Legislature: member of the legislature
 Congress: member of congress
 Senate: senator
 House of Representatives: representative
The generic term "deputy" may also be used, deriving from the concept that the legislator is "deputising" for the electorate of their electoral district.

By country 
This is an incomplete list of terms for a national legislator:

Substitute legislator 
Some legislatures provide each legislator with an official "substitute legislator" who deputises for the legislator in the legislature if the elected representative is unavailable. Venezuela, for example, provides for substitute legislators to be elected under Article 186 of its 1999 constitution. Ecuador, Panama, and the U.S. state of Idaho also have substitute legislators.

See also 
 List of legislatures by country

References

External links 

 
Legislature
Management occupations
Legal professions
Political occupations
Positions of authority